Frida Abramovna Vigdorova (16 March 1915, Orsha – 7 August 1965) was a Soviet journalist, novelist and writer. She is mostly known for her record of the trial of poet Joseph Brodsky in 1964.

Biography 
Vigdorova graduated from Moscow Pedagogic Institute. She was the author of a number of books on issues in education, including Diary of a Russian Schoolteacher (1954). She worked as a correspondent for Literaturnaya Gazeta.

In 1964, Vigdorova took notes during the trial of poet Joseph Brodsky, convicted for "social parasitism". Compiled without censorship, Frida Vigdorova's account circulated in samizdat and made its way to the West.

Further reading 
 Alexandra Raskina. Frida Vigdorova’s Transcript of Joseph Brodsky’s Trial: Myths and Reality // «Journal of Modern Russian History and Historiography», No. 7 (2014), pp. 144–180.

References 

1915 births
1965 deaths
People from Orsha
People from Orshansky Uyezd
Belarusian Jews
Soviet journalists
Soviet novelists
Soviet short story writers
Soviet women writers
Soviet women novelists